Wátina is the final album by Belizean musician, Andy Palacio, released in 2007 on the Cumbancha label. A member of the Garifuna people, Palacio utilizes grooves and melodies that are deeply rooted in Garifuna traditions. Backed by a multigenerational group of Garifuna players, Andy Palacio put together an album that gained massive success and spread Garifuna culture around the world. The album is seen as "a monumental tribute to the Garifuna of yesterday and tomorrow." The album reached #1 on the World Music Charts Europe in June 2007. Due to Wátina's success, Andy Palacio was named a UNESCO Artist for Peace and shared the 2007 WOMEX Award with Ivan Duran.

Recognition
 Amazon.com 100 Greatest World Music Albums of All Time (#1)
 OMM's Top 50 Albums of the Decade (#44)

Track List

References

2007 albums
World music albums